The 2021 PDC Pro Tour was a series of non-televised darts tournaments organised by the Professional Darts Corporation (PDC). Players Championships and European Tour events are the events that make up the Pro Tour. There were 32 PDC Pro Tour events held, 30 Players Championships and 2 European Tour events, and in a change to previous years, the Challenge and Development Tours were split with 12 UK and European editions each.

Prize money
The prize money for the Players Championship and European Tour events was unchanged from the 2020 levels.

This is how the prize money is divided:

PDC Tour Card
128 players are granted Tour Cards, which enables them to participate in all Players Championships events, the UK Open and qualifiers for all European Tour and select other televised events.

Tour cards

The 2021 Tour Cards are awarded to:
 (64) The top 64 players from the PDC Order of Merit after the 2021 World Championship. 
  resigned his card, and therefore,  moved into the top 64.
  resigned his card, and therefore,  moved into the top 64.
 (27) 27 qualifiers from 2020 Q-School not ranked in the top 64 of the PDC Order of Merit following the World Championship.
 (2) Two highest qualifiers from 2019 Challenge Tour ( and ).
 (2) The highest qualifiers from 2019 Development Tour ( and ).
 (2) Two highest qualifiers from 2020 Challenge Tour ( and ).
 (2) Two highest qualifiers from 2020 Development Tour ( and ).
 (8) The daily winners from the 2021 Qualifying Schools.

Afterwards, the playing field will be complemented by the highest qualified players from the Q-School Order of Merit until the maximum number of 128 Pro Tour Card players had been reached. In 2021, that means that a total of 21 additional players will qualify this way.

Q-School
The PDC Pro Tour Qualifying School (or Q-School) were split into a UK and European Q-School. Players that are not from Europe could choose which Q-School they wanted to compete in.

In a change from previous years, Q-School were split into two stages; with all players who lost their tour cards after the 2021 World Championship and the top sixteen players from the 2020 Challenge Tour and Development Tour Orders of Merit exempted to the final stage. The first stage would consist of two blocks of three days (with a maximum of 256 players per block) with the last four players from each block qualifying into the final stage. A ranking of other players will also be produced with players qualifying via that ranking to produce a full list of 128 players for each final stage.

Stage One took place in two blocks between 8–10 February & 11–13 February; with the Final Stage held between 14 and 17 February. The winner of each day's play were given a PDC Tour Card.

The UK Q-School was held at the Marshall Arena, Milton Keynes, England; with the European Q-School held at the H+ Hotel, Niedernhausen, Germany.

An Order of Merit was also created for each Q School. For every win after the Last 64 the players will be awarded 1 point.

To complete the field of 128 Tour Card Holders, places will be allocated down the final Qualifying School Order of Merits in proportion to the number of participants, with 13 cards going to the UK Q-School and 8 going to the European Q-School.

The following players picked up Tour Cards as a result:

UK Q-School Order of Merit
 
 
 
 
 
 
 
 
 
 
 
 
 

European Q-School Order of Merit

Players Championships
Due to the COVID-19 pandemic still being active, Players Championship events were again put into blocks, this time of 4 events, as opposed to 5 in 2020, with the first 20 Players Championship events being referred to as PDC Super Series 1–5. The final 10 events were split into 3 Super Series events (6–8), with 4 events in Super Series 7 and 3 in Super Series 6 and 8.

European Tour
The PDC announced the first (and only) two European Tour events of 2021 on 1 July 2021, with events to be held in Hungary, which was planned to make its debut as a host in 2020 before cancellation, and Gibraltar, returning after a year's absence.

PDC Challenge Tour
Due to the COVID-19 pandemic still being active, the Challenge Tour was split into UK and European events. The winner of each of the UK and European Orders of Merit at the end of 2021 received a PDC Tour Card, a place at the World Championships and a place at the Grand Slam of Darts.

UK Challenge Tour

European Challenge Tour

PDC Development Tour
Due to the COVID-19 pandemic still being active, the Development Tour was split into UK and European events. The winner of each of the UK and European Orders of Merit at the end of 2021 received a PDC Tour Card and a place at the Grand Slam of Darts and the 2022 PDC World Darts Championship.

As Bradley Brooks already qualified for the Grand Slam following his World Youth championship victory, the second placed player of the UK Development Tour, Nathan Rafferty, was granted the Grand Slam spot.

The European Development Tour Winner, Rusty-Jake Rodriguez already qualified for the World Championship via Pro Tour Order of Merit, therefore the second placed player qualified instead. German player Fabian Schmutzler debuted in PDC darts tournaments at the seventh event of the European Development Tour, and qualified for the 2022 PDC World Darts Championship.

UK Development Tour

European Development Tour

PDC Women's Series

The PDC Women's Series comprised 12 events held over two weekends. The woman who finishes top of the rankings and the runner-up after all 12 events will qualify for the 2022 PDC World Darts Championship.

Originally, the women who finished top of Events 5–8 and 9–12 were each going to qualify for the 2021 Grand Slam of Darts.

However, due to a lack of entrants for the opening weekend in Niedernhausen, the first four events were cancelled and reintegrated into the two weekends held in the United Kingdom. So, instead the winners of Events 1–6 and Events 7–12 each received a spot at the Grand Slam of Darts.

With three victories in five finals, Fallon Sherrock topped the Order of Merit after the first six events to book her Grand Slam entry.

After the ninth event of the series on 23 October, it was confirmed that Sherrock and Ashton, the only players to have won events thus far, were guaranteed to top the order of merit and locked in their return to the World Championship. Though Sherrock also topped the Event 7–12 Order of Merit, Ashton was granted the second Grand Slam spot as the highest ranked player not yet qualified.

Professional Darts Corporation Nordic & Baltic (PDCNB)

The PDCNB tour returned in August with five events over three days in Iceland.
Latvian PDC Tour Card Holder  topped the table after winning two of the five events. He was followed by Swedish tour card holder ,  of Finland, and the Danish newcomer Andreas Toft Jørgensen, each of the three winning a single event of the tour.

In addition to the three current and one former tour card holder on this ranking, the top three ranked Danish players gained entry via this method to the 2021 Nordic Darts Masters. They would ultimately be joined by Johan Engström to complete the field of eight local players.

In October, it was decided that there would be no more tour dates, and that the PDC would grant two places in the world championship to the top players by ranking, Razma and Larsson.

Dartplayers Australia (DPA) Pro Tour

The Dartplayers Australia Tour was modified to reduce the amount of travel required within the context of the global pandemic. The Tour consisted of seven regional bubbles spread over the six states and the Australian Capital Territory, with the top eight players from each State qualifying for the World Championship qualifier, along with eight players from a final knockout qualifier. Events in Tasmania were subsequently cancelled.

Queensland Bubble

New South Wales Bubble

ACT Bubble

Victoria Bubble

South Australia Bubble

Western Australia Bubble

Oceanic Masters
For the first time, on 30 October, the DPA Oceanic Masters was held virtually due to the COVID-19 pandemic.  The quarterfinals from the 82 person bracket yielded Ky Smith as the winner, who thus qualified for the PDC World Championship.

DPA Satellite Finals
On 31 October, the DPA hosted the virtual satellite finals. The quarterfinals from the 54 person bracket yielded Raymond Smith as the winner. This set history as Smith joined his son Ky, who won the previous day, as the first father and son duo to play at the same PDC World Championship.

EuroAsian Darts Corporation (EADC) Pro Tour
The EuroAsian Darts Corporation hosted 6 events held over 2 weekends. Dmitriy Gorbunov topped the rankings to secure a place partnering Tour Card Holder Boris Koltsov in the Russia team for the 2021 PDC World Cup of Darts.

Championship Darts Corporation (CDC) Pro Tour

On 10 May 2021, it was announced that the CDC would hold a 2021 tour consisting of six events of a USA Tour over two blocks of three in the USA in July and September, as there was still no guarantees of being able to have both American and Canadian players at the same event. A separate Canadian Tour took place in August and October. The final leader of both 2021 Tour rankings earned a place at the World Championships. The top 8 players of both 2021 Tour rankings earned a place at the 2021 CDC Continental Cup on 20 November. Danny Lauby Jr. and John Norman Jnr won the USA and Canada titles respectively, and qualified for the 2022 PDC World Darts Championship.

USA Tour

Canada Tour

Continental Cup
The CDC Continental Cup was held on 20 November. The tournament featured the top eight players from each of the US Tour and Canadian Tour (with the exception of Canadian No. 3 and 4, Matt Campbell and Dave Richardson who declined their invitation). The winner of Continental Cup earned entry into the 2022 PDC World Darts Championship and the 2022 US Darts Masters.

World Championship International Qualifiers

References

 
PDC Pro Tour
2021 in darts